The Sneeze is a 1988 play by Michael Frayn, based on four short stories and four one-act plays by Anton Chekhov.

References

Plays by Michael Frayn
Plays based on works by Anton Chekhov
1988 plays